CIVITAS is an initiative of the European Union to implement sustainable, clean and (energy) efficient urban transport measures. The initiative is co-ordinated by cities.

Etymology
CIVITAS is an acronym of CIty-VITAlity-Sustainability.

Chronology
 CIVITAS I started in early 2002 (within the Fifth European Community Framework Programme), with 19 cities clustered in 4 demonstration projects.
 CIVITAS II started in early 2005 (within the Sixth Framework Programme), consisting of 17 cities in 4 demonstration projects.
 CIVITAS PLUS started in late 2008 (within the Seventh Framework Programme), with 25 cities in 5 demonstration projects.
 CIVITAS PLUS II started in 2012, with 8 cities in 2 demonstration projects (lab projects).
 CIVITAS 2020 started in 2016, with 17 cities in 3 demonstration projects (lab projects).

See also
Crossing guard
Eltis
Walk Safely to School Day
Walk to school campaign
Walk to Work Day
Walking bus

References

External links
Civitas (official site)

2002 in the European Union
2005 in the European Union
2008 in the European Union
European Union and the environment
Transport and the European Union